Emanuel or Manolache Giani Ruset (1715 – 8 March 1794) was a Prince of Wallachia (May 1770 – October 1771), and Prince of Moldavia (May 11, 1788 – October 1788). He was a Phanariote and member of the Rosetti family.

Life 
Emanuel Giani Ruset is the son of a Greek pope named Ioannis, Giannis, or Tzanis and Euphrosine Ruset, great-granddaughter of Prince Antonie Ruset. The Italianization of the name seems to be a fantasy of a cleric in various documents; in any case the phanariots, as dragogists (interpreter-translators of the "Sublime Porte") were all polyglot and sometimes italianized or Frenchified their names.

He owes his ascension to the influence of his maternal family related to the Phanariot princes Mavrocordato, Caradja and Soutzo and whose name, deemed prestigious, he associates with his.

Emanuel Giani Ruset has various functions including Mare Spatar ("Minister of Defense", 1757) and Mare Postelnic ("Minister of the Interior and Justice") of Moldavia (1760). He became Prince of Wallachia from May 1770 to October 1771 during the Russian military administration of the country linked to the Russo-Turkish War of 1768–1774.

He was then named Prince of Moldavia in May 1788 after the deposition of Alexander Ypsilántis. His second reign ended in March 1789 with the occupation of Moldavia by the Austro-Russian forces during the Austro-Russian-Turkish War of 1787–1792.

He then retired to Chersonese in New Russia where he died in 1794: he was buried in the cathedral Sainte-Catherine of this city.

Sources 
 Alexandru Dimitrie Xenopol Histoire des Roumains de la Dacie trajane : Depuis les origines jusqu'à l'union des principautés. E Leroux Paris (1896)
 Nicolas Iorga Histoire des Roumains et de la romanité orientale. (1920)
  Constantin C. Giurescu & Dinu C. Giurescu, Istoria Românilor Volume III (depuis 1606), Editura Științifică și Enciclopedică, București, 1977.
 Mihail Dimitri Sturdza, Dictionnaire historique et généalogique des grandes familles de Grèce, d'Albanie et de Constantinople, M.-D. Sturdza, Paris, chez l'auteur, 1983 .
 Jean-Michel Cantacuzène, Mille ans dans les Balkans, Éditions Christian, Paris, 1992. 
 Joëlle Dalegre Grecs et Ottomans 1453-1923. De la chute de Constantinople à la fin de l'Empire Ottoman, L'Harmattan Paris (2002) .
 Jean Nouzille La Moldavie, Histoire tragique d'une région européenne, Ed. Bieler (2004), .
 Traian Sandu, Histoire de la Roumanie, Perrin (2008).

Rulers of Moldavia
Rulers of Wallachia
Year of death unknown
Rulers of Moldavia and Wallachia
Year of birth unknown
Emanuel Giani Ruset
1715 births